The following Confederate States Army units and commanders fought in the Battle of Bentonville of the American Civil War. The Union order of battle is shown separately.

Abbreviations used

Military rank
 Gen = General
 LTG = Lieutenant General
 MG = Major General
 BG = Brigadier General
 Col = Colonel
 Ltc = Lieutenant Colonel
 Maj = Major
 Cpt = Captain
 Lt = Lieutenant

Other
 w = wounded
 mw = mortally wounded
 k = killed

Army of the South
Gen Joseph E. Johnston, commanding

Army of Tennessee
LTG Alexander P. Stewart

Lee's Corps
MG D. H. Hill

Stewart's Corps
MG William W. Loring (became ill March 20)

MG Edward C. Walthall

Cheatham's Corps
MG William B. Bate

Department of North Carolina
Gen Braxton Bragg

Department of South Carolina, Georgia, & Florida
LTG William J. Hardee

 Chief of Staff: Ltc T. Benton Roy
 Engineer: Ltc William D. Pickett

Cavalry Command
LTG Wade Hampton III

Wheeler's Cavalry Corps
MG Joseph Wheeler
(Army of Tennessee)

References

Sources
 Bentonville State Historic Site website
 Bradley, Mark L. Last Stand in the Carolinas: The Battle of Bentonville. Campbell, California: Savas Publishing Company, 1996. .
 Hughes, Jr., Nathaniel Cheairs  Bentonville: The Final Battle of Sherman and Johnston. Chapel Hill, N.C.: University of North Carolina Press, 1996.

American Civil War orders of battle
Battle of Bentonville